Medhakachhapia National Park is an IUCN Category IV protected national park in Bangladesh. Established in 2004 the park was officially declared as a national park by the government of Bangladesh on 8 August 2008. It is located at the Chakaria Upazila under  Cox's Bazar District. It covers an area of 395.92 hectares.

It is a tropical evergreen forest under the control of Cox's Bazar North Forest Department. The main purpose behind establishing this  national park was to protect the century-old Rhizophora apiculata.

References

National parks of Bangladesh
Cox's Bazar District
Protected areas established in 2008
2004 establishments in Bangladesh
Forests of Bangladesh